The House of Representatives is the lower house of the National Assembly of Thailand, the legislative branch of the Thai government. The system of government of Thailand is that of a constitutional monarchy and a parliamentary democracy. The system of the Thai legislative branch is modelled after the Westminster system. The House of Representatives has 500 members, all of which are democratically elected: 400 members were elected through single member constituency elections, while the other 100 are elected through party lists parallel voting. The roles and powers of the House of Representatives were enshrined in the Constitution of 2017 which was amended in 2021.

The House of Representatives was temporarily abolished as a result of the 2014 Thai coup d'état and replaced with the unicameral National Legislative Assembly, a body of 250 members, selected by the National Council for Peace and Order. After the promulgation of the 2017 Constitution in April 2017, the House of Representatives was reestablished but the constitution allowed the military National Legislative Assembly to remain in place until the House of Representatives was formed following the 2019 general election.

Role

Bill Consideration 
The Cabinet, no less than 20 members of parliament, or 10,000 eligible voters through a petition may introduce a bill. However, if it's a money bill (a bill that has provisions concerning taxes, budgetary affairs or currency), it may be introduced only with the endorsement of the Prime Minister.

Where a bill's status as a money bill may be in question, a session between the speaker and all house committee chairs maybe convened to consider the status of the bill. The decision is made by a simple majority vote. If the vote is tied, the speaker must cast a tie-breaking vote.

When the process of consideration ends in the House and the bill is agreed to, the bill is sent to the senate for further deliberations; of which the process must be done within 60 days. The deadline for money bills is 30 days. If the senate is not able to deliberate within the time limit, the bill is considered to be agreed to by the senate.

If the bill is agreed to by the whole of the National Assembly, the prime minister must wait 5 days in order to give people the opportunity to challenge the bill's constitutionality. After which, the prime minister has 20 days to present the bill to the monarch for royal assent.

Any emergency act passed by the cabinet must be sent to the house for consideration without delay to be examined. If the house approves of the emergency act, it becomes an ordinary act. If not, the emergency act ceases to have effect after the decision has been published in the government gazette for one day.

Budget Consideration 
The 2017 Thai Constitution stipulates that the budget must be written in the form of an act, and in the introduction of a budget bill the government must show sources of income and estimates of further income, standards and measures of outcome and relevance to the 20 Year National Strategy and other national development plans. The budget must also adhere to guidelines outlined in the State Fiscal and Financial Disciplines Act.

The process of considering the budget is almost the same as considering a bill, although the deliberation deadline is extended to 105 days, and the senate is not able to amend the budget and must vote on it within 20 days.

Scrutiny of the government

Questioning a minister 
A member of parliament may submit a question to a minister both in writing and orally. Questions to a minister may be asked without the question being submitted in advance. A minister may refuse to answer the question if the answer would risk national security or if they consider it not to be in the national interest.

Ministers assigning civil servants or other people to answer in their place is commonplace practice rather than the exception.

Motion of no confidence 
No less than 1 in 5 members of parliament may introduce a motion to debate about a vote of no confidence in individual ministers or the entire cabinet. A simple majority is required for the motion to pass, and subsequently for the minister or the entire cabinet to cease.

Creation of committees 
Committees may be set up by the house to carry out affairs or investigate matters, or to study matters and report to the house according to a set time frame. A minister may be held accountable to the committee, and it is within their duty to aid the committee in the course of an investigation or to find facts by ordering civil servants within their ministry for them to testify in the committee or to comply with information requests.

Considering prime ministerial candidates 
In order for a candidate to stand, they must receive at least one tenth of the house's vote and must be named in the party list.

History
The House of Representatives was established after the Revolution of 1932, when the Khana Ratsadon (the "People's Party"), overthrew the absolute monarchy and replaced it with a system of constitutional monarchy. When King Prajadhipok signed the temporary constitution of 1932, he established the first legislative assembly in Thailand, It was an entirely royally-appointed chamber. The first session of the People's Assembly was held on June 28, 1932, in the Ananta Samakhom Throne Hall. From then on, the House existed in various forms until it was abolished in 2014:

See more at: Constitutions of Thailand

 1946 – The 1946 constitution established a fully elected House of Representatives.
 1949 – On June 5, 1949, Orapin Chaiyakan became the first woman to be elected to hold a post in the National Assembly of Thailand (specifically, the House of Representatives).
 1952 – Establishment of the unicameral National Assembly with 123 members. 
 1959 – The House was banned by Sarit Dhanarajata.
 1968 – The House was re-established with 219 members.
 1972 – The House was banned by Thanom Kittikachorn.
 1974 – Establishment of the House of Representatives.
 1976 – Establishment of a unicameral National Assembly with 360 royally-appointed members.
 1978 – Return of an elected House with 301 members.
 1991 – Establishment of a unicameral National Assembly with 292 appointed members.
 1997 – Establishment of a 500-member House of Representatives, 400 directly elected with 100 elected through proportional representation.
 2006 – Following the coup, an interim charter was signed establishing a 250-member National Legislative Assembly.
 2007 – Return to 500-member House with 375 members elected through single constituency elections and 125 appointed through party-list proportional representation, established, by referendum under the 2007 Constitution of Thailand.
 2014 – Abolished as a result of the 2014 Thai coup d'état.
 2017 – Re-established following 2017 constitution promulgation.

List of House of Representatives general elections

20st century

21st century

Qualification
The qualifications to be a candidate for the House of Representatives were outlined in Section 101, Part 2, Chapter 6 of the 2007 Constitution. The candidate had to be a citizen of Thailand by birth only, age of twenty-five or older on election day, and born in the province in which they intended to stand as a candidate. The candidate must have been a voter and therefore had to be on the electoral register for at least five years directly before the election, and must also had a house or have been in public service in the province for five years. The candidate must also had been a member of an educational institution in that province for at least five consecutive years. Politically, a candidate had to be a member of one political party for a period of at least ninety days before election day, except in cases of dissolution where thirty days was the minimum period. This was done to discourage party switching before the election. For party list candidates, they must also had to meet the same qualifications except for the provincial restrictions. They were instead divided in lists based on provincial groups.

Those specifically barred from being candidates were those: addicted to drugs, declared bankrupt, unable to vote (see voter eligibility below), former convicted felons (the individual had to wait for five years after release to become eligible), removed from public service for being corrupt or incompetent, had assets confiscated due to embezzlement and finally, the individual had not been a member of the government or civil service, Senate, local administrations, member of the judiciary or other independent agencies.

Elections

Before its abolishment, the House of Representatives had 500 members. 375 members were directly elected in single constituency elections by first-past-the-post voting. The 375 constituencies were divided by population according to the census and tambons. The other 125 members were voted based on 'proportional representation' it is actually in truth a parallel voting system or more precisely the Mixed Member Majoritarian system (MMM). In Thai general elections, voters had two votes: one to select the member of parliament for their constituencies and the second to choose which party they prefer. Seats were assigned to parties as a result through the d'Hondt method.

In accordance with the 2007 Constitution of Thailand, a general election was held every 4 years. Dissolution could happen anytime, which was done by the King with the advice of the prime minister through the use of the royal decree. Elections were held under universal suffrage; every voter had to be a citizen of Thailand, if not by birth then by being a citizen for 5 years. The voter had to be over 18 years old before the year the election was held. Voting in elections were also mandatory as missing an election would result in the loss of the right to be involved in political activities. Those barred from voting in House elections were members of the clergy, those suspended from the privilege for various reasons, detainees under legal or court orders and being of unsound mind or of mental infirmity.

Term and dissolution
The term of the House of Representatives was exactly four years from the previous election day. Upon the expiration of the House, the King would issue a decree calling for a general election of the House, in which the date of the election had to be announced. This had to be done within forty days of the expiration. The date of the election had to be the same for the entire Kingdom.

The King held the royal prerogative to dissolve the House before its expiration. When this happened a royal decree was issued where the election date was announced; this had to be done in no less than forty days and not more than sixty days from the date of the dissolution. The reasons and circumstances of a dissolution could be made only once.

Membership
Members of the House of Representatives were generally called Members of Parliament or MPs (. The membership of the House of Representatives commenced on election day. If there was a vacancy in the membership of the House, and it was not due to expiration or dissolution, it had to be re-occupied. Vacancies could occur due to death, resignation, conviction and/or expulsion (only by a parliamentary party through a 3/4 majority vote). If the vacancy was of a constituency member then an election had to be held within forty days of the vacancy, unless it was less than 180 days of the present term of the House, then the vacancy could remain.

In the case where the vacancy was made by a proportional representative member, the vacancy would be filled by the Speaker of the House of Representatives by submitting the name of the next candidate in the 
party list (submitted on election day) to be published in the Royal Gazette.  This had to be done within seven days.  If no name was found then the vacancy could remain unfilled.  Members of the House who had filled a vacancy under either of these procedures could only remain in the House for the remainder of its present term.

Leadership

Presiding officers

The executive committee of House of Representatives consisted of one speaker and two deputy speakers to be its presiding officers. The Speaker of the House was also the ex officio President of the National Assembly of Thailand. The election was done by a secret ballot in the first session; after a resolution was passed; the elected would be formally approved by the King. The Speaker and Deputy Speakers of the House could not be members of the cabinet or any political party executive committee. The speaker and his deputies were not entitled to represent partisan interests and had to exercise their powers on a non-partisan basis.

Leader of the Governing Coalition
The Constitution stipulated that the Prime Minister and the Ministers had to be former members of the House of Representatives. After the first session, the House had to vote in a resolution to elect a Prime Minister, after which the King would formally approve him within thirty days. The Prime Minister-elect was always the leader of the largest party in the House. However, under the electoral system, the House resulted in a hung parliament. After the 2007 election, six parties formed a governing coalition, electing Samak Sundaravej of the largest party, People's Power Party (PPP), the Prime Minister.

On August 5, 2011, the House elected Yingluck Shinawatra as Prime Minister against Abhisit Vejjajiva of the Democrat Party, to a vote of 265 for and 159 against.

Leader of the Opposition

After the appointment of the Cabinet, the King appointed the official Leader of the Opposition of Thailand. The Leader of the Opposition had to be the leader of the largest party with no members holding any ministerial positions. His party had to be larger than one fifth of the total number of the House. If no Party met this qualification then the Leader with most votes from parties with no ministerial positions would then be appointed. The Royal appointment had to be countersigned by the President of the National Assembly. The Leader of the Opposition led the Shadow Cabinet of Thailand.

Latest election result

See also

 Constitutions of Thailand
 2007 Constitution of Thailand
 National Assembly of Thailand

References
Constitution of the Kingdom of Thailand 2007
Background Note: Thailand: U.S. State Department public domain document

External links
https://web.archive.org/web/20060519150557/http://www.parliament.go.th/main.php
https://web.archive.org/web/20080513022240/http://www.parliament.go.th/files/mainpage.htm
Lists and Information of MPs

 
1932 establishments in Siam
Government of Thailand
Organizations based in Bangkok